Chris Evert defeated Evonne Goolagong Cawley in the final, 6–3, 4–6, 8–6 to win the ladies' singles tennis title at the 1976 Wimbledon Championships. It was her second Wimbledon singles title and her fifth major singles title overall.

Billie Jean King was the reigning champion, but did not defend her title as she had retired from singles play.

Three-time champion Maria Bueno competed at Wimbledon for the first time since 1968.

Seeds

  Chris Evert (champion)
  Evonne Goolagong Cawley (final)
  Virginia Wade (semifinals)
  Martina Navratilova (semifinals)
  Olga Morozova (quarterfinals)
  Rosie Casals (quarterfinals)
  Sue Barker (quarterfinals)
  Kerry Reid (quarterfinals)

Qualifying

The seeding list was accurately reflected in the tournament result, with all the seeds achieving their expected final achievements. This is the only example in the entire Wimbledon history where the seeding for either the gentlemen's or ladies' singles has been replicated in the results.

Draw

Finals

Top half

Section 1

Section 2

Section 3

Section 4

Bottom half

Section 5

Section 6

Section 7

Section 8

See also
 Evert–Navratilova rivalry

References

External links

1976 Wimbledon Championships – Women's draws and results at the International Tennis Federation

Women's Singles
Wimbledon Championship by year – Women's singles
Wimbledon Championships
Wimbledon Championships